Days Between Stations is a partnership between guitarist Sepand Samzadeh and keyboardist Oscar Fuentes Bills.  They named the band after the 1985 novel by Steve Erickson. Samzadeh describes the band's sound as "art-rock", while Fuentes describes it as "post-prog".

Biography
The duo came together in Los Angeles in November 2003 after Samzadeh placed an ad in the Music Connection magazine. Release of their first album was pushed back several times as the band members faced various difficulties, including the death of a family member.

In 2004, Fuentes and Samzadeh sent Bruce Soord, leader of the British band The Pineapple Thief, a CD with nearly an hour's worth of mostly improvised material. Soord used some of this material as the basis for the song "Saturday" on The Pineapple Thief's 12 Stories Down (Cyclops 2004).

To help flesh out their sound in the studio, the band contacted former Young Dubliners drummer Jon Mattox in 2005. Mattox joined in as drummer and co-producer. The band further enlisted guitarist Jeremy Castillo, Argentinian-born bassist Vivi Rama, sax player Jason Hemmens, singer Hollie Shepard, trumpeter Sean Erick and trombonist Kevin Williams. Samzadeh's uncle Jeffrey Samzadeh, who sings traditional Iranian classical music, also sang on the track "Requiem for the Living".

Their eponymous debut CD was released in October 2007 on Bright Orange Records. It was engineered by Evren Goknar of the Capitol Mastering team who is best known for his work with Queensrÿche, Red Hot Chili Peppers and Yes. The album received positive reviews and radio airplay. Former Yes guitarist Peter Banks said of the album: "Days Between Stations offer an inventive, eclectic mix of electronics: sometimes relaxed sound-washes interspersed with a rhythm-driven force... the subtle textures are played with a refreshing honesty and openness underpinned with an authentic transparency of sound that avoids most of the pitfalls and potholes of scary 'prog'."

Days Between Stations second album,  In Extremis, was released in May 2013. It was co-produced by former Yes member Billy Sherwood and Days Between Stations and it features contributions from veteran prog musicians Peter Banks, Rick Wakeman and Tony Levin.

In June 2014, the band released their first music video for the track "The Man Who Died Two Times" from the album In Extremis, featuring Colin Moulding of XTC on lead vocals.

The band's third album, Giants, was released in September 2020. It was co-produced by former Yes member Billy Sherwood and the band. "Giants is a contender for best of 2020... It is co-produced by Billy Sherwood of Yes fame, who also plays bass, drums, and handles lead vocals on most of the songs. Colin Moulding, who sang The Man Who Died Two Times on In Extremis, returns to sing on Goes By Gravity, while Durga McBroom, who sang on several Pink Floyd songs sings lead on Witness the End of the World.

The band will be releasing their first ever pre-recorded live concert which took place in Los Angeles in May 15th 2022.  The band will release this as a Blu-Ray/CD combo digipak in later 2023. 

Days Between Stations finished recording an original film score for a documentary movie on French artist Jean Paul Bourdier so far titled Nature Humaine.  The band will release this work digitally and on CD in 2023.  

Additionally, in 2019 Sepand Samzadeh, Billy Sherwood and Jennifer Jo Oberle collaborated on a side project and named the band "The Settlements", the album will be released in 2023.  Days Between Stations is currently working on establishing a YouTube channel/podcast and completing their fourth album.

Style
The band cite as influences progressive rock (Pink Floyd, Marillion, Peter Gabriel, Genesis, King Crimson) to post-rock (Sigur Rós, Godspeed You Black Emperor!), ambient music (Brian Eno, early Tangerine Dream), jazz-rock (Miles Davis' early 1970s output), post-punk (Sonic Youth, The Melvins, The Jesus Lizard) and contemporary classical (Philip Glass, Steve Reich, John Adams).

Band members

2003-present
 Sepand Samzadeh – Lead Guitar, Rhythm Guitar, keyboards
 Oscar Fuentes – keyboards, Acoustic Guitar, Bass

Discography

Compact discs
2007: Days Between Stations
2013: In Extremis
2020: Giants

Music Videos
The Man Who Died Two Times (June 2014) Days Between Stations YouTube Channel

Contributors
 Jon Mattox – drums
 Jeremy Castillo – Guitar
 Vivi Rama - Bass
 Jason Hemmens - Saxophone
 Hollie Shepard - vocals
 Sean Erick - Trumpet
 Kevin Williams - Trombone
 Jeffery Samzadeh - vocals
 Colin Moulding - vocals
 Durga McBroom - vocals
 Peter Banks - Guitar
 Rick Wakeman - Keyboards
 Tony Levin -  Chapman Stick | Bass
 Billy Sherwood –  Vocals | Bass

Album Reviews
 www.Progressia.net > Review (French)
 blog.sinarchive.com > Review (Persian)
 www.rockarea.eu > Review (Polish)
 www.ragazzi-music.de > Review (German)
 www.planeta-rock.com.ar > Review (Argentina)
 www.proggnosis.com > Review (English)
 randombrainwave.blogspot.com > Review (Australian)
 www.space-rock.co.uk > Review (UK)
 www.seaoftranquility.org > Review (English)
 www.geocities.com/prognaut > Review (English)
 www.theprogfiles.com > Review (English)
 www.rocktimes.de > Review (German)
 www.dprp.net > Review (English)

Notes

External links 
daysbeweenstations.com Official band site
Official Myspace site

Musical groups established in 2003
Musical groups from Los Angeles
Progressive rock musical groups from California
Psychedelic rock music groups from California